Copper(I) telluride is an inorganic compound with the chemical formula Cu2Te. It can be synthesized by reacting elemental copper and tellurium with a molar ratio of 2:1 at 1200 °C in a vacuum. Cu2Te has potential applications in thermolectric elements and in solar cells, where it is alloyed with cadmium telluride to create a heterojunction.

References

Copper(I) compounds
Tellurides